El ocaso del socialismo mágico is a 2016 documentary film directed by Italian director Michele Calabresi. The film explores the effects of Venezuelan President Hugo Chávez's populism and his victory in the 1998 presidential elections, as well as his mistakes.

Themes 
Calabresi's intention was to show the achievements as well as the often forgotten and ignored and mistakes of chavismo to the European left wing, who had romanticized chavismo and had been reluctant to admit the consequences of the growing militarism and authoritarianism in Venezuela. The director presents this through six chapters: leadership and anti-politics; the two left wings; opposition: from the coup to the vote; Chávez and the workers, participatory democracy; and the appearance of Hugo Chávez on the public scene, his arrival in power and the achievements and mistakes of his administration (Petrostate and magical socialism).

Reception 
Américo Martín in El Nuevo Herald described it as an "excellent" documentary, saying that the capacity was at its limit at the  theatre in Caracas, where he watched the documentary, and that entrances ran out.

Cast

References

External links 
 
 Official website
 Tráiler de "El ocaso del socialismo mágico", Efecto Cocuyo - YouTube
 El ocaso del socialismo mágico LA PEOR DE LAS UTOPÍAS, por Américo Martín - Ideas de Babel

2016 documentary films
Documentary films about Venezuela
2010s Spanish-language films